White Pants Willie is a 1927 American comedy film directed by Charles Hines and written by Howard J. Green. It is based on the 1924 novel White Pants Willie by Elmer Davis. The film stars Johnny Hines, Leila Hyams, Henry A. Barrows, Ruth Dwyer, Walter Long and Margaret Seddon. The film was released on July 24, 1927, by First National Pictures.

Cast
Johnny Hines as Willie Bascom
Leila Hyams as Helen Charters
Henry A. Barrows as Philip Charters 
Ruth Dwyer as Judy
Walter Long as Mock Epply
Margaret Seddon as Winifred Barnes
George Kuwa as Wong Lee
Bozo the Goose as Peaches

References

External links
 

1927 films
1920s English-language films
Silent American comedy films
1927 comedy films
First National Pictures films
American silent feature films
American black-and-white films
Films directed by Charles Hines
1920s American films